Coach Rocky Knute is a fictional character created by Jay Ward for the Rocky & Bullwinkle cartoon. He was based loosely on the real-life coach at Notre Dame, Knute Rockne.

He was the coach at Wossamotta U, where Bullwinkle J. Moose and his sidekick, Rocket J. "Rocky" Squirrel, attended on a football scholarship. Their big game was against the Mud City Manglers, a group of thugs dressed in drag that Boris Badenov assembled to bet on—and beat—Wossamotta's football team. Since they looked like girls, Rocky and Bullwinkle (and team) were a little reluctant to play them—until the deception was uncovered.

Coach Rocky Knute was voiced by Paul Frees.

Sources
Past editions of the Bullwinkle Show, Voices.fuzzy.com

Rocky and Bullwinkle characters
Fictional sports coaches